The 2017 IRFU Women's Interprovincial Series was won by Munster who clinched the title following an 11–5 win over Leinster on the final day of the competition. Munster and Leinster both finished the competition with two wins and ten points each. Munster were subsequently declared champions on points difference. Munster were coached by Laura Guest and captained by Siobhan Fleming.

Final table

Results

Round 1

Round 2

Round 3

References

2017–18 in Irish rugby union
2017–18 in European women's rugby union
rugby union
IRFU Women's Interprovincial Series
December 2017 sports events in Europe